Toab Khan (24 April 1934 – 1 October 2022) was a Bangladeshi journalist. He served as the Advisory Editor of the Bengali daily Janakantha. He was awarded Ekushey Padak in 2016 by the Government of Bangladesh.

Early life and career
Toab Khan was born on 24 April 1934 in Satkhira. He started journalism in 1955. He worked for Dainik Sangbad and Dainik Pakistan. He was a press secretary to Prime Minister Sheikh Mujibur Rahman and later he served as a chief information officer and director general of the Press Institute of Bangladesh (PIB). He was also a press secretary to President HM Ershad and President Shahabuddin Ahmed. He died on 1 October 2022, at the age of 88.

Awards
 Ekushey Padak (2016) – Journalism.

References

1934 births
2022 deaths
Bangladeshi journalists
Recipients of the Ekushey Padak
Honorary Fellows of Bangla Academy
People from Satkhira District